La Patrie was a Montreal, Quebec daily newspaper founded by Honoré Beaugrand on February 24, 1879. It became a weekly in 1957 and folded in 1978.

Its political affiliation was originally Liberal, but Beaugrand officially broke with the party in 1891 and the paper became deprived of its traditional support group.  La Patrie's circulation numbers sagged until Beaugrand, in declining health, sold his newspaper for $50,000 to Joseph-Israël Tarte in 1897.

By the turn of the twentieth century Tarte had turned his new property into an increasingly nonpartisan publication with the city's second-largest circulation for a French-language daily newspaper (topped only by La Presse). The victim of bitter circulation wars against old rival La Presse and the politically connected Montréal-Matin, The daily La Patrie folded on November 15, 1957, but was survived by a weekly edition under the same name published until April 1978.

Notable staff
Charles Mayer (1922 to 1933), sportswriter and municipal reporter
Télesphore Saint-Pierre, redactor

See also
List of Quebec media

References

External links
Digitized issues of La Patrie at the National Library of Quebec

Newspapers established in 1879
Publications disestablished in 1978
Defunct newspapers published in Quebec
French-language newspapers published in Quebec
Newspapers published in Montreal
Daily newspapers published in Quebec
1879 establishments in Quebec
1978 disestablishments in Quebec